Department of Industry and Commerce may refer to:

 Department of Industry and Commerce (1975–82), an Australian government department
 Department of Industry and Commerce (1982–84), an Australian government department
 Department of Industry and Commerce (Ireland)